Xixi Bridge is a  long suspension bridge on the border of Dafang County and Qianxi County in Guizhou, China. The bridge forms part of China National Highway 321 between Bijie and Guiyang.

See also
 List of highest bridges in the world
 List of longest suspension bridge spans

External links
http://highestbridges.com/wiki/index.php?title=Xixihe_Bridge_Guibi

Suspension bridges in China
Bridges in Guizhou
Bridges completed in 2001